Hillsborough is an incorporated town in San Mateo County, California, in the San Francisco Bay Area. The population was 11,387 as of 2020.

History

Hillsborough is located on the Rancho San Mateo Mexican land grant which was purchased by William Davis Merry Howard, son of a wealthy Hillsborough, New Hampshire, shipping magnate, in 1846. Howard settled his family in this area, which attracted wealthy San Franciscans. On May 5, 1910, Hillsborough residents voted to incorporate. From the town's foundation until 1963, it was an exclusive community for wealthy whites. In 1963, Jack and Betty Ken, the first-generation children of Chinese Immigrants, purchased land in the town. This made them the first non-white people to own land in the town, effectively desegregating Hillsborough.

Geography and environment

The area's considerably winding, hilly topography, and impossibility of a grid layout make Hillsborough notoriously challenging to navigate. Many lots include fairly steep slopes, particularly the western side of the town, with the landscape generally flattening to the east as it descends from the 280 freeway to El Camino Real and the towns of Burlingame and San Mateo.

Three prominent streams drain the mostly wooded slopes of Hillsborough: San Mateo Creek, Cherry Canyon Creek, and Sanchez Creek. In all 3 cases the upper watersheds are closed-canopy California oak woodlands, with dominant trees of Coast Live Oak, Pacific Madrone and California Bay.

The upper drainage area of San Mateo Creek in Hillsborough contains significant serpentinite outcrops, which are known habitats for several rare plant species including the San Mateo woolly sunflower. Other common plants include toyon, gooseberry, lupine, monkeyflower and coffeeberry. Commonly observed mammals include California mule deer, raccoons, opossum, coyotes, rabbits, squirrels, and skunks.

Hillsborough is bordered by Burlingame to the north, San Mateo to the east, Highlands-Baywood Park to the south, and Interstate 280 to the west.

As a result, there are no apartments, condominiums or townhouses in the city limits.

The town has no commercial zoning and thus no businesses within the town limits; the only non-residential properties are the town's four public and three private schools, town and county government facilities, a golf course, a country club, and small parks.

Demographics

2010
At the 2010 census Hillsborough had a population of 10,825. The racial makeup of Hillsborough was 7,178 (66.3%) White, 42 (0.4%) African American, 7 (0.1%) Native American, 3,044 (28.1%) Asian, 23 (0.2%) Pacific Islander, 109 (1.0%) from other races, and 422 (3.9%) from two or more races. Hispanic or Latino of any race were 373 people (3.4%).

The census reported that 10,825 people (100% of the population) lived in households, as no other type of residence exists in Hillsborough.

There were 3,693 households, 1,445 (39.1%) had children under the age of 18 living in them, 2,804 (75.9%) were opposite-sex married couples living together, 220 (6.0%) had a female householder with no husband present, 114 (3.1%) had a male householder with no wife present.  There were 66 (1.8%) unmarried opposite-sex partnerships, and 34 (0.9%) same-sex married couples or partnerships. 451 households (12.2%) were one person and 309 (8.4%) had someone living alone who was 65 or older. The average household size was 2.93.  There were 3,138 families (85.0% of households); the average family size was 3.18.

The age distribution was 2,877 people (26.6%) under the age of 18, 466 people (4.3%) aged 18 to 24, 1,600 people (14.8%) aged 25 to 44, 3,667 people (33.9%) aged 45 to 64, and 2,215 people (20.5%) who were 65 or older.  The median age was 47.5 years. For every 100 females, there were 94.8 males.  For every 100 females age 18 and over, there were 91.9 males.

There were 3,912 housing units at an average density of 632.0 per square mile, of the occupied units 3,490 (94.5%) were owner-occupied and 203 (5.5%) were rented. The homeowner vacancy rate was 1.3%; the rental vacancy rate was 4.2%.  10,206 people (94.3% of the population) lived in owner-occupied housing units and 619 people (5.7%) lived in rental housing units.

In 2019, a Bloomberg analysis ranked Hillsborough as the fifth richest town in the United States.

2000
At the 2000 census there were 10,825 people, 3,689 households, and 3,161 families in the town.
Of the 3,689 households 36.3% had children under the age of 18 living with them, 78.6% were married couples living together, 4.9% had a female householder with no husband present, and 14.3% were non-families. 11.1% of households were one person and 7.3% were one person aged 65 or older. The average household size was 2.93 and the average family size was 3.14.

The age distribution was 25.1% under the age of 18, 4.4% from 18 to 24, 19.7% from 25 to 44, 32.2% from 45 to 64, and 18.6% 65 or older. The median age was 46 years. For every 100 females, there were 94.6 males. For every 100 females age 18 and over, there were 91.6 males.

The median household income was $193,157 and the median family income  was $200,000. Full-time male workers have a median income of $100,000+ versus $55,882 for full-time female workers. The per capita income for the town was $98,643. About 1.8% of families and 2.8% of the population were below the poverty line, including 2.7% of those under age 18 and 0.8% of those age 65 or over. According to The Best Places to Live 2007 in Money Magazine, Hillsborough's $263,456 median household income is the highest in the country.

Politics
According to the California Secretary of State, on February 10, 2019, Hillsborough had 7,802 registered voters. Of those, 2,638 (33.8%) were registered Democrats, 2,337 (30%) were registered Republicans, and 2,522 (32.3%) had declined to state a political party.

Schools 
Hillsborough has its own highly regarded and ranked public elementary and middle school system, but no public high school. High school-aged children can attend one of several schools in the San Mateo Union High School District, generally assigned by residential address.  The town is also home to a small number of independent schools. The Hillsborough school district is the top-rated K through 8 district in northern San Mateo County.

 The Nueva School, a nationally recognized independent school serving gifted and talented students.
 Crocker Middle School, a public middle school, located on Ralston Avenue, named after William H. Crocker, 
 West Elementary School, a public elementary school, located on Barbara Way.
 South Elementary School, a public elementary, at 303 El Cerrito.
 North Elementary School, a public elementary, at 545 Eucalyptus Avenue.
 Bridge School (California), a school serving students with physical and speech impairments.
 Crystal Springs Uplands School, a college preparatory middle and high school.

Landmarks 
Primarily a residential suburb of San Francisco, Hillsborough has many mansions and other points of interest within the town's borders dating from the early 20th century.

 Arthur and Mona Hofmann House – Designed by Richard Neutra and is placed on the National Register of Historic Places.
Carolands — Built by Harriet Pullman Carolan, heiress to the Pullman railway. At 65,000 ft² (6,000 m2), it is one of the largest residences in the United States and is placed on the National Register of Historic Places.
 Skyfarm — Built by William H. Crocker, namesake of Crocker middle school, and grandson of Charles Crocker of California's Big Four railroad magnates. Designed by Arthur Brown, Jr., and opened in 1930. Home since the 1960s to The Nueva School.
 Tobin Clark Estate –  Originally designed by the noted architect David Adler for Mrs. Celia Tobin Clark, one of the Peninsula's most prominent families of the early 20th Century
 Uplands — Built by Templeton Crocker, as a gift to his fiancée Helène Irwin, heiress to the C&H Sugar family fortune. Designed by Willis Polk; opened in 1912, with interior of 35,000 ft² (3,250 m2). Home since the 1950s to Crystal Springs Uplands School.
 Western White House — Commissioned by George Randolph Hearst, son of William Randolph Hearst and now privately owned. It, like Hearst Castle was designed by Julia Morgan.
 Junípero Serra statue — Overlooking Highway 280, the statue was built in honor of Father Junípero Serra.
 Sidney Bazett Residence — Designed by the architect Frank Lloyd Wright in 1939, the Bazett Residence is a fine example from his "Usonian" period.  Completed in 1940, the house remains largely in its original condition.  Another notable feature of the house is that one of its former occupants was Joseph Eichler, whose tenancy in the house is said to have greatly influenced the eventual designs used in his successful housing developments of the 1950s-1960s.
 ′The Flintstone House′ (a.k.a. the Adobe/Dome/Bubble/Marshmallow/Gumby house) — designed by architect William Nicholson and built in 1976 using sprayed concrete over balloon-shaped forms, now painted a deep/burnt orange color reminiscent of the Golden Gate Bridge's distinctive hue. The house can be seen to the east from the Doran Memorial Bridge, northbound on Highway 280 between the Bunker Hill and Hayne/Black Mountain exits.

Climate
December is the coolest month with an average high of 60 degrees, and September is the warmest month with an average high of 78 degrees. Hillsborough has a Mediterranean climate (Köppen climate classification Csa), with the vast majority of the precipitation from the months of November to April. On average, Hillsborough receives  of rain. With coastal mountains to the west of Hillsborough, it is blocked in the winter from much of the rainfall over Half Moon Bay, and in the summer it is blocked from virtually all the fog of the coast. Hillsborough receives an average of 307 days of sunshine annually, with 52 days of recordable precipitation per year.

Notable people

 Toni Breidinger – NASCAR Driver
 Roxy Bernstein – sports broadcaster
 Pat Burrell – baseball player
 Alyssa Campanella – Miss California USA 2011
 Sam Chavez – professional golfer
 Imelda Marcos - former first lady of the Philippines
 Jenny Craig – weight loss guru, founder of Jenny Craig, Inc.
 William H. Crocker – founder and president of Crocker National Bank, member of committee that built San Francisco Opera House and Veterans Building
 Bing Crosby – singer, actor, raised his second family in Hillsborough
 Nathaniel Crosby – U.S. Amateur golf champion, son of Bing Crosby
 Eric Dane – actor
 Andre Ethier—baseball player
 Kathy Garver – actress
 Marjorie Gestring – diver, youngest Olympian to win gold medal
 Michael Grimes – managing director at Morgan Stanley
 Patty Hearst – heiress of Hearst newspaper fortune
 William Randolph Hearst I – newspaper publisher, politician, builder of Hearst Castle
 Rickey Henderson – Hall of Fame baseball player
 Charles B. Johnson – former chairman at Franklin Templeton Investments
 Erik Kislik – Professional Chess Player
 Brigitte Lin – Taiwanese actress
 Phyllis Welch MacDonald - actress
 Greg Maddux – Hall of Fame baseball pitcher
 David Marquardt – co-founder of venture capital firm August Capital
 Timothy Francis McCarthy – Former President of Charles Schwab
 Sidney Mobell – artist and jeweler
 Larry Probst – chairman and former CEO of Electronic Arts (EA)
 Alicia Silverstone - grew up in Hillsborough actress 
 J.T. Snow – baseball player
 Jackie Speier – U.S. Representative from 14th district
Ryan Roslansky - CEO of LinkedIn
Jason Calacanis - Internet entrepreneur
 Lucio Tan –  businessman
 Bud Tribble – vice president of software technology at Apple Inc., among founders of NeXT, Inc.
 Marshall Tuck – politician
 Troy Tulowitzki – baseball player
 George Tupou V – King of Tonga
 Salote Mafile'o Pilolevu Tuita – Tongan princess, only daughter of former King Tāufaʻāhau Tupou IV
 Siosa'ia Ma'ulupekotofa Tuita – Tongan diplomat and Consul General of San Francisco, husband of Salote Mafile'o Pilolevu Tuita
 Martin Yan – chef, star of TV show "Yan Can Cook," lives with family in Hillsborough
 Jimmy Kimmel – Comedian
 Jeremy Lin - Professional basketball player
Alden W. Clausen - President, The World Bank (1981-1986), President & CEO BankAmerica Corp. & Bank of America NT&SA (1970-1981 & 1986-1991)
Caspar Weinberger - Secretary of Defense, Secretary of Health, Education & Welfare

Further reading
Dwyer, Michael Middleton. Carolands. Redwood City, CA: San Mateo County Historical Association, 2006.

References

External links

 

1910 establishments in California
Cities in San Mateo County, California
Cities in the San Francisco Bay Area
Incorporated cities and towns in California